Erland von Hofsten (19 September 1780 – 10 December 1839), was a Swedish ironmaster, and heir to the Valåsen Works.

Life and work 
Erland von Hofsten was born on September 19, 1780, at Valåsen Manor, Karlskoga, Sweden, and was the first of nine children of Bengt and Christina Lovisa von Hofsten (née Geijer). His father was an ironmaster at Valåsen Works. In 1793, he enrolled at Uppsala University.

In 1805, he served as a clerk at the administrative courts of appeal in Sweden.

In 1822, Erland von Hofsten married Johanna Nordenfeldt. The couple's daughter, Johanna Christina von Hofsten, was a children's writer.

Hofsten died on December 10, 1810, in Stockholm. He and his wife were buried at the Karlskoga Old Cemetery, near Karlskoga Church.

References

Citations

Works cited 

 

1780 births
1839 deaths
Swedish landowners
Swedish ironmasters
People from Karlskoga Municipality
Swedish nobility
Erland
Burials at Karlskoga Old Cemetery
Swedish untitled nobility
19th-century Swedish businesspeople